Pterolophia postscutellaris is a species of beetle in the family Cerambycidae. It was described by Stephan von Breuning in 1967.

References

postscutellaris
Beetles described in 1967